Scaphinotus interruptus is a species of ground beetle in the family Carabidae ("ground beetles"), in the suborder Adephaga ("ground and water beetles").
It is found in North America.

References

Further reading
 Arnett, R.H. Jr., and M. C. Thomas. (eds.). (2000). American Beetles, Volume I: Archostemata, Myxophaga, Adephaga, Polyphaga: Staphyliniformia. CRC Press LLC, Boca Raton, FL.
 Bousquet, Yves (2012). "Catalogue of Geadephaga (Coleoptera, Adephaga) of America, north of Mexico". ZooKeys, issue 245, 1–1722.
 Erwin, Terry L. (2007). A Treatise on the Western Hemisphere Caraboidea (Coleoptera): Their classification, distributions, and ways of life. Volume I. Trachypachidae, Carabidae - Nebriiformes 1, 323 + 22 plates.
 Richard E. White. (1983). Peterson Field Guides: Beetles. Houghton Mifflin Company.
 Ross H. Arnett. (2000). American Insects: A Handbook of the Insects of America North of Mexico. CRC Press.

External links
NCBI Taxonomy Browser, Scaphinotus interruptus

Carabidae